Academical Choir of Nizhny Novgorod State Linguistic University (full name: Academical Choir of Nizhny Novgorod State Linguistic University named after N. A. Dobrolyubov/ Choir LUNN; Russian: Народный коллектив России Академический хор Нижегородского государственного лингвистического университета имени Н. А. Добролюбова/ Хор НГЛУ) - is one of the student (independent) creative artistic groups of LUNN.

History 

The LUNN Choir (also known as: Choir of Foreign Languages State University of Nizhny Novgorod) was founded in 1991 by the Merited Cultural Worker of Russia Federation Vera Ignatievna Sladchenko, on the premises of Foreign Languages State Pedagogical University of Nizhny Novgorod named after N. A. Dobrolyubov. A huge contribution to the development of the choir was made by Georgy Pavlovich Muratov, a Merited Worker of Art of the RSFSR, a professor of Nizhny Novgorod State Glinka Conservatoire. He was the author of many arrangements, which were written specifically for the LUNN Choir. The performance of classical repertoire, folk and contemporary songs in various languages of the world remains the main signature feature of the choir since the very moment of its creation and it provides a unique artistic image for the choir. The LUNN Choir is one of the first in the Nizhny Novgorod region to introduce Western European trends into its works. The on-stage performance group is tasked with adding popular European and American songs, American spirituals, instrumental theatre and outstanding dance numbers into its program. Moreover, the choir has created its annual choral shows.

In 2001, the LUNN Choir was awarded the title of “The People’s Artistic Group of Russia”. From 2012 to 2016 the choir was led by Alyona Igorevna Yegorova - a graduate of the Nizhny Novgorod State Glinka Conservatoire. Since 2016, the artistic and chief conductor of the choir has been Maxim Aleksandrovich Ivanov, a laureate of international competitions, a graduate of the Nizhny Novgorod State Glinka Conservatoire, a teacher of the Nizhny Novgorod Musical College named after M.A. Balakirev. 
 
Over the years, choirmasters and concertmasters of LUNN Choir were Dmitry Chadov, Galina Talamanova, Lilia Semyonova, Ksenia Yalynnaya, Maxim Ivanov, Alyona Yegorova, Narine Sargsyan, Elena Grishanova, Dinara Serebrennikova, Oleg Chernyshov, Olga Malova.

Songs in various languages of the world make up the majority of and are an integral part of the choir's repertoire. Through many years, the choir has performed songs in more than 50 languages, such as French, English, German, Italian, Latin, Japanese, Korean, Basque, Spanish, Greek, Turkish, Hebrew, Hindi, Balinese, Ukrainian, Polish, Czech, Latvian, Georgian, Tamil, etc.

Every year the choir consistently makes guest appearance in Europe and in cities of Russia. The LUNN Choir is a laureate and winner of Grand Prix awards in Italy, France, Germany, Spain, the Czech Republic, Austria, Hungary, Poland, Ukraine and Russia. Over recent years, the choir has been actively participating in joint choral meetings with its sister-choirs. There were touring concert programs in Riga, Minsk, Prague, St. Petersburg, Vladimir, Yaroslavl, Kirov, Kazan, Arzamas and other cities.

Currently, there are students of all years of education and all faculties of the university in the choir. The repertoire includes choral literature of Russian and foreign classics, national music from different peoples around the world, opera choirs, numbers from musicals, religious music.

In November 2018, LUNN Choir became the chief institutor of the International Choir Assembly "Coro di Linguisti", which unites student choirs of linguistic universities from Nizhny Novgorod, Moscow (student chapel choir "Musica Linguae" at the premises of Moscow State Linguistic University) and Minsk (student choir "CANTUS JUVENTAE" at the premises of Minsk State Linguistic University).

 “The LUNN Choir is one of the few Russian student groups that are seriously and enthusiastically engaged in their favorite work; the choir is distinguished by sincerity and an enthusiastic attitude towards music, the ingenuousness of its reception”.

Lev Sivukhin, People's Artist of the Russian Federation, Professor of Nizhny Novgorod State Glinka Conservatoire.

 “The LUNN Choir has a soft spot for the lyrical-romantic manner, which affects the style of its performance, in which I want to highlight the deep immersion with the author's idea, flexibility and elegance of details, coherence and softness of the sound”.

L.V. Shamina, professor of the Gnessin State Musical College.

 LUNN Choir "... occupies its rightful place amongst the best choirs of Russia, this group is a cultural icon of the famous Nizhny Novgorod choral school and a continuator of its deep and world-renowned traditions. Nowadays, such choral groups create the history of modern choral music".

Boris Tarakanov, professor, conductor, public figure.

The LUNN Choir released two repertory collections "LUNN Choir Sings". The author of the arrangements and processing is Georgy Pavlovich Muratov, professor of the Nizhny Novgorod State Glinka Conservatoire, a Merited Arts Worker of the Russian Federation.

Music director and choirmasters 

At present, the LUNN Choir’s music director and chief conductor is Maxim Aleksandrovich Ivanov.

He is an award winner of different international competitions and a music teacher from the Nizhny Novgorod Musical College named after M. A. Balakirev. He graduated from the Nizhny Novgorod State Glinka Conservatoire (under the leadership of professor V. A. Kurzhavsky) and assistant-internship (led by professor E. B. Fertelmeister). He is a music director of the Nizhny Novgorod Youth Choir, an institutor of the "Coro di Linguisti" International Choral Assembly (which integrates linguistic choirs of Nizhny Novgorod, Moscow and Minsk), the author and the instructor of the "Psychophysiology of musical performance" ILT (Instructor-led training), a member of the academic staff commission "Choral conducting" and "Vocal art " of the Nizhny Novgorod Musical College named after M. A. Balakirev. Maxim Ivanov is a frequent member of the jury in national and international competitions. Over the years, he was the leader of the Izhevsk Municipal Chamber Choir named after P. I. Tchaikovsky, the Youth Choir "Movement", the choir of music teachers of Nizhny Novgorod, as well as a conductor of children's choirs.

Choir LUNN choirmasters

Narine Vaganovna Dvorshenko

In 2009, she graduated from the Kirov College of Musical Arts named after I. V. Kazenin (led by Tatiana Evgenievna Shurakova). In 2014, she graduated from the Nizhny Novgorod State Glinka Conservatoire (under the leadership of professor E. B. Fertelmeister). Since 2013, she has held the position of LUNN Choir choirmaster.

Alyona Igorevna Bondina

In 2007, She graduated with honors from the Izhevsk Republican Music College (led by M. B. Sannikova) and, in 2012, she graduated from the Nizhny Novgorod State Glinka Conservatoire (under the leadership of professor E. B. Fertelmeister). A. I. Bondina is an award winner of an international competition in Paris, France. Since 2010 she has held the position of LUNN Choir choirmaster.

List of achievements 

 The People’s Artistic Group of Russia (2001)
 A participant in the cultural program "Russian Fair" (Germany, 2004)
 A winner of the international festival "Singers of the Third Millennium" (Rostov-on-Don, 2005)
 A winner of the contest "Young Prague" (Czech Republic, 2007)
 Recipient of the Golden diploma during the international festival "Riva del Garda" (Italy, 2008)
 The recipient of the Grand Prix during the international festival named after F. Shalyapin in Yalta (2009)
 A winner of the contest-festival "Danube Rainbow" (Hungary, 2009)
 The recipient of the Grand Prix during the R. Schumann International Festival (Germany, 2010)
 A winner of the contest-festival "Golden Voices" (Spain, 2010)
 The recipient of the Grand Prix during an international competition in Paris (France, 2011)
 A winner of the contest-festival "Prague Voices" (Czech Republic, 2013)
 A winner during the International Choral Festival in Vienna (Austria, 2014)
 A winner of the International Festival "Young Voices" (Nizhny Novgorod, 2016)
 A winner of the second "Christmas Choral Festival in Warsaw" (Poland, 2016)
 A winner of the International Choral Assembly "Golden Crane" (Moscow, 2017)
 The recipient of the first degree diploma from the International Competition-Festival "Viva Roma" (Italy, 2018)
 A recipient of the Golden diploma from the International Choral Assembly "Coro di Liinguisti" (Russia-Belarus, 2018)
 A winner of the second "International Choral Competition named after M.G. Klimov" (Kazan, 2019)
 The recipient of the Grand Prix from the IX International Festival "Tallink Show" in (Latvia-Sweden, 2019)

References

External links 

 An official web-site of Nizhny Novgorod State Linguistic University named after N. A. Dobrolubov
 The LUNN Choir on Russian Choral Portal
 Academical Choir of Nizhny Novgorod State Linguistic University on You-Tube
 The LUNN Choir (VK)
 Academical Choir of Nizhny Novgorod State Linguistic University named after N. A. Dobrolubov | LUNN
 Russian wiki-page about the LUNN Choir

Russian choirs
University choirs
Musical collectives